Knotting Green is a hamlet located in the Borough of Bedford of Bedfordshire, England. It is in the civil parish of Knotting and Souldrop.

The settlement is close to Knotting, Souldrop and Riseley. The nearest town to Knotting Green is Rushden in Northamptonshire.

Hamlets in Bedfordshire
Borough of Bedford